Nazan Öncel (born 6 February 1956) is a Turkish singer-songwriter. She also does the arrangements for most of them and has written songs for such singers as Tarkan and İbrahim Tatlıses.

Biography and career
In 1978, her song "Sana Kul Köle Olmuştum" ("I Had Become Your Slave"), written by Erdener Koyutürk and Özdener Koyutürk, was aired on radio and television, and Nazan's interesting voice attracted attention. Her first album (LP), Yağmur Duası (Prayer for Rain) was published in 1982. The first album, where all of the songs were written by Öncel herself, was published in 1992, by the title "Bir Hadise Var" ("There is an Issue"). In 1994, she published her second album Ben Böyle Aşk Görmedim (I Didn't See Love like This) and album included a 1994 hit with its video, "Geceler Kara Tren" ("The Nights are Dark Train").

Her 1996 album "Sokak Kızı" ("Stray Girl") included a more rock-oriented sound than its predecessor. The album included four singles and three of this singles; "Erkekler de Yanar" ("The Men Are on the Hook, too"), "A Bu Hayat" ("This Life") and "Bırak Seveyim Rahat Edeyim" (Let Me Love You and Have Peace) became hits with their videos.

Nazan Öncel has finished working on her 7th studio album. It features 12 new songs and is titled 7'n Bitirdin. The mastering process of the album has been seen through by Miles Showell in London, who is known for his works with artists such as Queen, Elton John and George Michael.

Discography

Studio albums

Remix albums

Singles

Compilation albums

Charts

See also
 Nazan Saatci

Notes

External links
Nazan Öncel official website

1956 births
Living people
Turkish women singers
Turkish pop singers
Turkish singer-songwriters
Musicians from İzmir